= Central Mahé =

Central Mahé is a region of Seychelles.
